Atakan Akkaynak (born 5 January 1999) is a German professional footballer who plays as a midfielder for Çorum FK.

Club career
Akkaynak was at Bayer 04 Leverkusen before signing a three-year contract with Willem II in June 2018.

He made his Eredivisie debut on 17 August 2018 appearing as a substitute against Groningen.

International career
Akkaynak has represented Germany at Under-19 level having captained their U18 and U17 sides. He is also eligible for Turkey because of his descent (he also holds Turkish citizenship).

References

External links
 

Living people
1999 births
People from Troisdorf
Sportspeople from Cologne (region)
German people of Turkish descent
German footballers
Footballers from North Rhine-Westphalia
Association football midfielders
Eredivisie players
Süper Lig players
3. Liga players
Bayer 04 Leverkusen players
Willem II (football club) players
Çaykur Rizespor footballers
Türkgücü München players
German expatriate footballers
German expatriate sportspeople in the Netherlands
Expatriate footballers in the Netherlands